The 1954 Michigan State Spartans football team represented Michigan State College in the 1954 Big Ten Conference football season. In their second season in the Big Ten Conference and their first season under head coach Duffy Daugherty, the Spartans compiled a 3–6 overall record and 1–5 against Big Ten opponents.

The Spartans' prospects were diminished when their best back, Leroy Bolden, was injured in the early in the 1954 season. Michigan State tackle Randy Schrecengost was selected as a first-team player on the 1954 All-Big Ten Conference football team.

The 1954 Spartans won one of their three annual rivalry games. In the annual Indiana–Michigan State football rivalry game, the Spartans defeated the Hoosiers by a 21 to 14 score to give Daugherty his first victory as head coach. In the Notre Dame rivalry game, the Spartans lost by only one point, 20-19, to a Fighting Irish team that finished the season ranked #4 in the final AP Poll. And, in the annual Michigan–Michigan State football rivalry game, the Spartans lost by a 33 to 7 score.

In non-conference play, the Spartans routed Washington State by a 54 to 6 score, and concluded their season with a 40-10 victory over Marquette.

Schedule

Roster
 G Hank Bullough, Sr.

References

Michigan State
Michigan State Spartans football seasons
Michigan State Spartans football